Yeva Vybornova (born 13 November 1974) is a Ukrainian fencer. She competed in the women's épée event at the 1996 Summer Olympics.

References

External links
 

1974 births
Living people
Ukrainian female épée fencers
Olympic fencers of Ukraine
Fencers at the 1996 Summer Olympics
20th-century Ukrainian women
21st-century Ukrainian women